Sadad is a coastal village situated on the western shore of Bahrain. It is situated to the south of Malkiya and to the west of Hamad Town, in the Northern Governorate administrative region of the country.

During the Bahrain uprising, the village was a hotspot for clashes between police and anti−government protesters.

References

Populated places in the Northern Governorate, Bahrain
Populated coastal places in Bahrain